Raymore may refer to:

Places
Canada
Raymore, Saskatchewan, a town
Raymore Drive in Toronto, partly washed out by flooding during Hurricane Hazel (1954)
United States
Raymore, Missouri, a city
Raymore, Wisconsin, an unincorporated community